Abgehauen is a 1998 German television docudrama directed by Frank Beyer and based on the autobiographical book of the same name by Manfred Krug. (Abgehauen. Ein Mitschnitt und ein Tagebuch. Düsseldorf: ECON 1996). Frank Beyer won an Adolf Grimme Award for his work on the film.

External links
 

1998 television films
1998 films
German television films
Films based on autobiographies
Films directed by Frank Beyer
1990s German-language films
German-language television shows
Biographical films about actors
Films set in the 1970s
Cold War films
Films set in East Germany
Das Erste original programming